The International Philosophical Quarterly is a peer-reviewed academic journal edited by a group of academics at Fordham University, with the collaboration of the Université de Namur in Belgium. The journal was established in 1961 to provide a publishing forum for the international exchange of basic philosophical ideas. It is published by the Philosophy Documentation Center.

Abstracting and indexing 
The journal is abstracted and indexed in:

See also 
 List of philosophy journals

References

External links 
 

English-language journals
Philosophy journals
Quarterly journals
Publications established in 1961
Philosophy Documentation Center academic journals